The Kichuy or Kiçü is a river in Tatarstan, Russian Federation, a right-bank tributary of the Sheshma.

Major tributaries are the Butinka, Batraska, Chupayka, Yamashka, and Tetvelka. Drainage is regulated.

References 

Rivers of Tatarstan